John Freningham (1345–1410) was an English politician and a member of Parliament for Kent.

Life
Freningham was born in East Farleigh, the eldest son and heir of Ralph Freningham, MP, and his wife Katherine. Circa 1365, he married Alice Uvedale, the daughter of Thomas Uvedale, MP. They had no children.

Career
Freningham was appointed High Sheriff of Kent for 1378-79 and 1393–94 and elected Member of Parliament for Kent in October 1377, 1381 and 1399.

He was a member of Henry IV’s council from 1 November 1399 to 10 March 1401.

Death
His nephew, John Pympe, son of his sister and Reynold Pympe, was his main heir.

References

 

1345 births
1410 deaths
People from East Farleigh
English MPs October 1377
15th-century English people
High Sheriffs of Kent
English MPs 1381
English MPs 1399